La Cassa di Ravenna S.p.A., formerly Cassa di Risparmio di Ravenna S.p.A. and Cassa di Risparmio di Ravenna, is an Italian savings bank. The bank is based in Ravenna, Emilia-Romagna region. The bank also has branches in Ancona and Gabicce Mare in Marche region and in Rome, Lazio region.

History

In 2016, the minority shareholders of subsidiary Argentario, including Assicurazioni Generali (for 13.50%), accepted the plan to sell their shares of Argentario to the bank, for 16.191 shares of Argentario to 1 share of the bank. The bank paid the minority shareholders by treasury shares. The bank owned 98.24% shares of the intermediate holding company, increasing from 82.30%.

Subsidiaries

 Banco di Lucca e del Tirreno
 Italcredi (70.00%)
 Sorit (76.05%)
 Banca di Imola
 Consultinvest Asset Management SGR (Joint venture, 50.00%)
former
 Argentario (ex-Società Finanziaria di Banche Romagnole)

Former equity interests
 Cassa di Risparmio di Saluzzo (2%)

See also

  Cassa di Risparmio di Cesena - another bank from Romagna region
 Banca di Romagna
  Cassa dei Risparmi di Forlì e della Romagna - another bank from Romagna region
  Banca Carim - another bank from Romagna region

References

External links
 

Banks established in 1840
1840 establishments in the Papal States
Banks of Italy
Companies based in Ravenna
Italian companies established in 1840